Elections to the French National Assembly were held in Tunisia on 21 October 1945 as part of the wider French elections. Two members were elected from the territory, with both seats won by the French Rally, which was linked with the Rally of Left Republicans. The seats were taken by Louis Brunet and Antoine Colonna.

Results

References

1945 in Tunisia
Elections in Tunisia
Tunisia
October 1945 events in Africa
Tunisia